Robert Dickson may refer to:

 Robert Dickson (writer) (1944–2007), Canadian poet and academic, winner of the Governor General's Award for French-language poetry in 2002
 Robert Dickson (fur trader) (c. 1765–1823), fur trader and official in the Indian Department in Upper Canada
 Robert Dickson (Upper Canada politician) (1796–1846), lawyer and political figure in Upper Canada
 Robert Dickson (Nova Scotia politician) (1777–1835), farmer and political figure in Nova Scotia
 Robert Dickson (architect) (1926–2014), Australian architect
 Robert Dickson (sailor) (born 1998), Irish sailor
 Robert Dickson (1843–1924), Swedish politician, governor in Jönköping and Stockholm, Governor of Stockholm
 Rob Dickson (1963–2009), Australian rules footballer, winner of Australian Survivor, and film director
 Bruce Dickson (Robert Bruce Dickson, born 1931), Canadian ice hockey player.
 Brian Dickson (Robert George Brian Dickson, 1916–1998), Chief Justice of Canada
 Bob Dickson (born 1944), American golfer
 Bobby Dickson (born 1955), Scottish former footballer
 Sir Robert Dickson, 1st Baronet (died 1711), MP of the Parliament of Scotland
 Sir Robert Dickson, 2nd Baronet (1694–1760)
 Robert Temple Dickson II, member of the Texas House of Representatives
 Robert Temple Dickson III, his son, American politician from Texas

See also
 Robert Dixon (disambiguation)
 Robert Dickinson (disambiguation)
 Dickson (surname)